Yefim Mikhailovich Galperin (Russian: Ефим Михайлович Гальперин, Ukrainian: Юхим Михайлович Гальперін) (born August 30, 1946 in Dnipropetrovsk, Ukraine) is a Russian American producer, film director, scenarist, journalist, and writer. He is known for Russian-language films and documentaries as well as his contributions to the Russian children's comedy TV show Yeralash.

Biography

Galperin graduated from Dnipropetrovsk's National Mining University of Ukraine in 1970 as an engineer and later attended the National University of Theatre, Film and TV in Kiev, Ukraine. He graduated from there in 1979 as a film director.

Later he worked in the Dovzhenko Film Studios in Kiev, the Sverdlovsk Film Studio in Yekaterinberg, and the Gorky Film Studio in Moscow. Since 1992, Galperin has resided in the United States where he has anchored and produced content for the Russian-language television channel WMNB. Currently, he is a writer and journalist.

Filmography

Galka-Professor. Documentary. 1967. Scenarist and director. First prize at All-Union Festival of the U.S.S.R., various awards at International Film Festival in Belgrade, Yugoslavia.
Caring. Documentary. 1970. Scenarist and director. Various awards at All-Union Film Festival of the U.S.S.R.
Tomorrow. Documentary. 1977. Scenarist and director.
Free Composition. Feature film. 1978. Scenarist and director.
The Old Man. Feature film. 1979. Scenarist and director. Audience and jury prizes at International Youth Film Festival in Kiev.
These Are the Miracles. Musical comedy. 1982. Director.
Yeralash. Various short films. 1983-1987. Scenarist and director.
A House With Ghosts. Feature film. 1988. Director. Grand Prix of the International Film Festival for Children in Argentina. Various awards at film festivals in Romania and Germany.
Blya. Satirical comedy. 1990. Producer, co-scenarist, and director. Audience and jury prizes at All-Union Comedy Film Festival in Odessa.
Rabbi. Documentary. 1996. Producer, scenarist, and film director.
The Neighbor's Part in the Story. Documentary film. 1998. Scenarist and director.
Nine Grams of Pure Silver. Documentary. 1999. Scenarist and director.
Gariki and Humans. Documentary series. 2001. Producer, co-scenarist, and director.

Bibliography
Psychoanalytical Endeavors: Lunacy of a Scumbag. 2014. Author.
Anomaly (Shpoler Zeyde). 2014. Author.
Villa With a View on Vesuvius (Orphans). 2014. Author.

References 

1946 births
Living people
Film people from Dnipro
Kyiv National I. K. Karpenko-Kary Theatre, Cinema and Television University alumni
Russian film producers
Russian film directors
21st-century American journalists
21st-century Russian journalists
Russian documentary filmmakers
American documentary film directors
American documentary film producers
20th-century Russian male writers
21st-century American male writers
20th-century American male writers
American male journalists
20th-century American journalists